Lil Dagover (born Marie Antonia Siegelinde Martha Seubert; 30 September 1887 – 23 January 1980) was a German actress whose film career spanned between 1913 and 1979. She was one of the most popular and recognized film actresses in the Weimar Republic.

Early life
Lil Dagover was born Marie Antonia Siegelinde Martha Seubert in Madiun, Java, Dutch East Indies (now Indonesia) to German parents. Some sources inaccurately give her birth name as Marta Maria Lillits.  Her father, Adolf Karl Ludwig Moritz Seubert, born in Karlsruhe/Baden  Germany, was a forest ranger in the service of the Dutch colonial authorities. She had two siblings. Her mother died in 1897, after which she returned to Germany, where she lived with relatives in Tübingen. She was educated at boarding schools in Baden-Baden, Weimar, and Geneva, Switzerland.

Orphaned at the age of 13, she spent the rest of her adolescence with friends and relatives. After completing her education she began pursuing a career as a stage actress around the principal cities of Europe. In 1907 she married actor Fritz Gustav Josef Daghofer, who was fifteen years her senior. The couple had a daughter, Eva (born 1909) but divorced a decade later, in 1919. Eva married Hungarian director Géza von Radványi in 1930.

Seubert began using a variant of her husband's surname as a professional moniker – changing the spelling of "Daghofer" to "Dagover".

Acting career in the Weimar Republic

Lil Dagover made her screen debut in a 1913 film by director Louis Held. During her marriage to Fritz Daghofer, she was introduced to several notable film directors; among them Robert Wiene and Fritz Lang. Lang cast Dagover in the role of 'O-Take-San' in the 1919 exotic drama Harakiri which proved to be Dagover's breakout role. The following year, she was directed by Robert Wiene in the German Expressionist horror classic Das Kabinett des Doktor Caligari, from a script by Carl Mayer and Hans Janowitz opposite actors Werner Krauss and Conrad Veidt. Lang directed Dagover in three more films: 1919's Die Spinnen (English title: Spiders), 1921's Der Müde Tod (English release titles: Destiny and Behind The Wall), and 1922's  Dr. Mabuse der Spieler.

By the early 1920s, Dagover was one of the most popular and recognized film actresses in the Weimar Republic, appearing in motion pictures by such prominent directors as F. W. Murnau, Lothar Mendes and Carl Froelich. In 1925 she made her stage debut under the direction of Max Reinhardt. In the following years she played in Reinhardt’s Deutsches Theater in Berlin and also at the Salzburg Festival. In 1926 she married film producer Georg Witt, who produced many of Dagover's future films. The couple remained married until Witt's death in 1973.

Lil Dagover's film career in German cinema through the 1920s was prolific, making over forty films and appearing opposite such actors as Emil Jannings, Nils Olaf Chrisander, Willy Fritsch, Lya De Putti, Bruno Kastner and Xenia Desni. She also made several films in Sweden for directors Olof Molander and Gustaf Molander and appear in several French silent films – her last film appearance of the 1920s was in the 1929 Henri Fescourt-directed French silent film Monte Cristo opposite Jean Angelo and Marie Glory.

Talkies and the Third Reich

With the advent of talkies, Lil Dagover ceased making foreign films and appeared only in German productions; with the exception of one English language American film, the Michael Curtiz-directed drama The Woman from Monte Carlo (1932) with actor Walter Huston, shot on location in the United States.

After her return to Germany and the rise of the Third Reich in 1933, she avoided overt political involvement and generally appeared in popular costume musicals and comedies during World War II. However, in 1937, she received the State Actress award, and in 1944 she was awarded the War Merits Cross for entertaining Wehrmacht troops on the Eastern Front in 1943 and on the German occupied Channel Islands of Jersey and Guernsey in 1944.

While Dagover's films of the period were decidedly apolitical, she was known to be one of Adolf Hitler's favorite film actresses and Dagover is known to have been a dinner guest of Hitler's on several occasions.

Later career
After the defeat of Nazi Germany, Dagover continued to appear in West German films. In 1948, she appeared in the anti-Nazi drama Gaspary's Sons. The film follows the disintegration of a German family living under National Socialism. Dagover's most internationally popular film of the post-WWII era is the 1959 Alfred Weidenmann-directed adaptation of the 1901 Thomas Mann novel Buddenbrooks.

In 1960, Dagover began appearing in numerous West German television roles in addition to continuing to perform in film. In 1973 she starred in the Academy Award-nominated and Golden Globe-winner for Best Foreign-Language Foreign Film of 1973, The Pedestrian. The film was directed by Austrian actor-director Maximilian Schell, and featured international former early silent film peers Peggy Ashcroft, Käthe Haack, Elisabeth Bergner, Elsa Wagner and Françoise Rosay.

Dagover's last film role was at age 91 in the 1979 Maximilian Schell-directed and produced drama motion picture Tales from the Vienna Woods.

Death and legacy

In 1962, Lil Dagover was awarded the Bundesfilmpreis. In 1964, she was awarded the Bambi annual television and media award from Hubert Burda Media, and the Cross of Merit of the Federal Republic of Germany in 1967.
In 1979, she published her autobiography, Ich war die Dame (English: I Was The Lady). Dagover died at the age of 92, on 24 January 1980, in Munich, Bavaria, West Germany, and was buried at the Waldfriedhof Grünwald cemetery, near Munich.

Filmography

 Die Retterin (1916) *Credited as Martha Daghofer
 Clown Charly (1917) *Credited as Martha Daghofer
 Das Rätsel der Stahlkammer (1917) *Credited as Martha Daghofer
 Lebendig tot (1918)
 Der Volontär (1918)
 The Song of the Mother (1918) *Credited as Martha Daghofer
 Bettler GmbH (1919)
 The Mask (1919)
 The Spiders (1919) as Sonnenpriesterin Naela
 The Dancer (1919) as Mutter Rellnow
 Harakiri (1919) as O-Take-San
 Phantome des Lebens (1919)
 Revenge Is Mine (1919)
 The Cabinet of Dr. Caligari (1920) as Jane Olsen
 Spiritismus (1920)
 The Woman in Heaven (1920) as Tatjana
 The Hunt for Death (1920–1921, part 1, 2, 3) as Tänzerin Malatti
 The Mayor of Zalamea (1920) as Isabel
 The Blood of the Ancestors (1920) as Fürstin Wanda Lubowiczka
 The Kwannon of Okadera (1920) as Kwannon
 The Eyes of the Mask (1920)
 The Secret of Bombay (1921) as Die Tänzerin Farnese
 Island of the Dead (1921)
 The Medium (1921)
 Destiny (1921) as Young Woman / Das junge Mädchen / Zobeide / Monna Fiametta / Tiao Tsien
 Murders in the Greenstreet (1921)
 Dr. Mabuse: The Gambler (1922) (uncredited)
 Luise Millerin (1922) as Luise Millerin
 Power of Temptation (1922)
 Phantom (1922) as Marie Starke
 Lowlands (1923) as Martha
 Princess Suwarin (1923) as Tina Bermonte
 His Wife, The Unknown (1923) as Eva
 Comedy of the Heart (1924) as Gerda Werska
 Chronicles of the Gray House (1925) as Bärbe
 The Humble Man and the Chanteuse (1925) as Toni Seidewitz
 Tartuffe (1925) as Frau Elmire / Elmire, Orgon's wife
 Wenn die Filmkleberin gebummelt hat (1925)
 The Brothers Schellenberg (1926) as Esther
 Love is Blind (1926) as Diane
 The Violet Eater (1926) as Melitta von Arthof
 Only a Dancing Girl (1926) as Marie Berner - varieté dansös
 His English Wife (1927) as Cathleen Paget, née Brock
 Orient Express (1927) as Beate von Morton
 Attorney for the Heart (1927) as June Orchard
 The Maelstrom of Paris (1928) as Lady Amiscia Abenston
 The Secret Courier (1928) as Mme. Thérèse de Renal
 Hungarian Rhapsody (1928) as Camilla
 La grande passion (1928) as Sonia de Blick
 Marriage (1929)
 Monte Cristo (1929) as Mercédès / Comtesse de Morcerf
 Hungarian Nights (1929) as Coraly Rekoczi
 The Favourite of Schonbrunn (1929) as Kaiserin Maria Theresia
 The Ring of the Empress (1930) as Catherine the Great
 The White Devil (1930) as Nelidowa
 There Is a Woman Who Never Forgets You (1930) as Tilly Ferrantes
 Va Banque (1930) as Miß Harriet Williams
 The Old Song (1930) as Baronin Eggedy
 Boycott (1930) as Seine Frau
 Die große Sehnsucht (1930) as Herself, Lil Dagover
 The Case of Colonel Redl (1931) as Vera Nikolayevna
 Elisabeth of Austria (1931) as Elisabeth of Austria
 The Congress Dances (1931) as The Countess
 Madame Bluebeard (1931) as Frau Erika Dankwarth
 The Woman from Monte Carlo (1932) as Lottie Corlaix
 The Dancer of Sanssouci (1932) as Barberina Campanini
 Thea Roland (1932) as Thea Roland
 Johannisnacht (1933) as Lisa Lers, Schauspielerin
 The Fugitive from Chicago (1934) as Eveline
 A Woman Who Knows What She Wants (1934) as Mona Cavallini, Revuestar
  (1934) as Lisa Behmer
 The Bird Seller (1935) as Der Kurfürstin
 Lady Windermere's Fan (1935) as Mrs. Erlynne
 The Higher Command (1935) as Madame Martin
 Augustus the Strong (1936) as Gräfin Aurore Königsmark
 Final Accord (1936) as Charlotte Garvenberg, seine Frau
 The Girl Irene (1936) as Jennifer Lawrence
 Fridericus (1937) as Marquise de Pompadour
 The Kreutzer Sonata (1937) as Jelaina Posdnyschew
 Strife Over the Boy Jo (1937) as Leonine Brackwieser - seine Frau
 Beate's Mystery (1938) as Beate Kaiserling
 Triad (1938) as Cornelia Contarini
 Maja zwischen zwei Ehen (1938) as Maja
 The Stars Shine (1938) as Herself
 Detours to Happiness (1939) as Hanna Bracht
 Friedrich Schiller (1940) as Franziska von Hohenheim
 Bismarck (1940) as Queen Eugénie
 The Little Residence (1942) as Herzogin von Lauffenburg
 Vienna 1910 (1943) as Maria Anschütz
 Music in Salzburg (1944) as Ursula Sanden
 Gaspary's Sons (1948) as Margot von Korff
 Don't Play with Love (1949) as Florentine Alvensleben
 A Day Will Come (1950) as Mme. Mombour
 Chased by the Devil (1950) as Frau Dakar
 The Secret of the Mountain Lake (1952) as Lamberta
 Red Roses, Red Lips, Red Wine (1953) as Gräfin Waldenberg
 His Royal Highness (1953) as Gräfin Löwenjoul
 Hubertus Castle (1954) as Baronin Kleesberg
 I Know What I'm Living For (1955) as Alice Lechaudier
 The Fisherman from Heiligensee (1955) as Baronin Hermine von Velden
 Roses in Autumn (1955) as Mrs. von Briest
 The Barrings (1955) as Thilde von Barring
 Crown Prince Rudolph's Last Love (1956) as Kaiserin Elisabeth
 My Sixteen Sons (1956) as Frau Senator Giselius
 Confessions of Felix Krull (1957)
 Beneath the Palms on the Blue Sea (1957) as Contessa Celestina Morini
 The Buddenbrooks (1959, part 1, 2) as Elisabeth Buddenbrook
 The Strange Countess (1961) as Gräfin / Lady Leonora Moron
  (1969, TV film) as Die Maharani
 The Pedestrian (1973) as Frau Eschenlohr
 Karl May (1974) as Bertha von Suttner
 Tatort (1975, Episode: "") as Mutter Koenen
 End of the Game (1975) as Gastmann's Mother
 The Standard (1977) as Erzherzogin
 Tales from the Vienna Woods (1979) as Helene (final film role)

References

Further reading

External links
 
 Lil Dagover: Schauspielerin (in German)
 Lenin Imports
 Photographs and literature

1887 births
1980 deaths
People from Madiun
German film actresses
German silent film actresses
German stage actresses
German television actresses
Commanders Crosses of the Order of Merit of the Federal Republic of Germany
20th-century German actresses